Rodrigo Oliveira de Bittencourt (born 20 March 1983 in Canoas), nicknamed Diguinho, is a Brazilian retired footballer who played as a defensive midfielder.

He played for Fluminense from 2009 to 2014 where he won two league titles. He also took part in the final of the 2009 Copa Sudamericana against LDU Quito of Ecuador.

Honours
Botafogo
Campeonato Carioca: 2006

Fluminense
Campeonato Carioca: 2012
Série A: 2010, 2012

Vasco da Gama
Campeonato Carioca: 2016

References

External links

1983 births
Living people
People from Canoas
Brazilian footballers
Association football midfielders
Campeonato Brasileiro Série A players
Sport Club Internacional players
Esporte Clube Cruzeiro players
Cruzeiro Esporte Clube players
Canoas Sport Club players
Mogi Mirim Esporte Clube players
Botafogo de Futebol e Regatas players
Fluminense FC players
CR Vasco da Gama players
Sport Club São Paulo players
Sportspeople from Rio Grande do Sul